Bernard James Cotton  (born 30 June 1948) is a field hockey coach and former player and captain. He won 73 caps for England and 54 for Great Britain, representing the country at the 1972 Summer Olympics. He went on to serve as Great Britain's assistant manager at the 1988 Summer Olympics, where the team won a gold medal, and as manager at the 1992 Summer Olympics, where they finished sixth.

Having gained a degree in Geography at Fitzwilliam College, Cambridge, he worked as a geography teacher at Bishop's Stortford College for six years in the late 1960s and 1970s. He then taught at Bedford School before returning to Bishop's Stortford College during the 1990s. He left the school to work as a performance director for the British Olympic Association, later becoming Performance Manager. In 2009 he was appointed MBE for services to sports.

References

External links
 
Bernard James Cotton British Olympics Association

1948 births
Alumni of Fitzwilliam College, Cambridge
English male field hockey players
Olympic field hockey players of Great Britain
British male field hockey players
Field hockey players at the 1972 Summer Olympics
English field hockey coaches
Schoolteachers from Hertfordshire
Members of the Order of the British Empire
Living people
Place of birth missing (living people)
Southgate Hockey Club players